Usakos railway station is a railway station in Namibia serving the city of Usakos. It is part of the TransNamib railway network. The station building is dilapidated but passenger trains still stop at Usakos.
 

When the Windhoek—Swakopmund line was built in 1902 during Imperial Germany's colonial rule of German South West Africa, it also connected Usakos. In 1914 this line was extended to Walvis Bay.

Usakos is connected to a number of towns in the north of Namibia via the railway junction in nearby Kranzberg, and to the south and east of Namibia via Windhoek.

See also
 Rail transport in Namibia

References

Notes

Literature
 

Railway stations in Namibia
TransNamib Railway
Buildings and structures in Erongo Region
1902 establishments in German South West Africa